A regional election will be held in Madeira no later than October 2023, to determine the composition of the Legislative Assembly of the Autonomous Region of Madeira. The election will replace all 47 members of the Madeira Assembly, and the new members will then elect the President of the Autonomous Region.

The current president, Miguel Albuquerque from the Social Democratic Party (PSD), is currently leading a coalition government between the Social Democrats and the CDS – People's Party, and will defend the dominance of the Social Democratic Party in the islands since 1976. The PSD and CDS–PP will contest the election in a joint coalition.

Electoral system
The current 47 members of the Madeiran regional parliament are elected in a single constituency by proportional representation under the D'Hondt method, coinciding with the territory of the Region.

Parties

Current composition
The table below lists parties represented in the Legislative Assembly of Madeira before the election.

Opinion polls

Graphical summary

Polling

Paulo Cafôfo as PS leader

See also
Madeira

Notes

References

External links
Election results
Comissão Nacional de Eleições
ERC - Official publication of polls

Elections in Madeira
Madeira